Devon Michael Arnold (born 24 November 2001) is an English footballer who plays as a forward for  club Salisbury.

Career
Born in Winchester, Hampshire, Arnold grew up in Tidworth, Wiltshire and was educated at The Wellington Academy, Ludgershall. Having joined Yeovil Town's academy from the Elite Training Centre in November 2016, Arnold was offered a youth scholarship deal to remain with the Glovers in December 2017. On 1 January 2019, Arnold made his debut for Yeovil in EFL League Two as a late substitute in their 4–1 defeat against Cheltenham Town, at the age of just 17 years and 38 days he broke the record for the youngest Yeovil player in the English Football League. Arnold was released by Yeovil at the end of the 2019–20 season when his youth scholarship expired.

Following his release by Yeovil, Arnold spent time on trial with Premier League side Manchester United.

On 10 September 2021, Arnold signed for Southern League Premier Division South side Salisbury.

Career statistics

References

External links
Devon Arnold profile at the Yeovil Town F.C. website

2001 births
Living people
Sportspeople from Wiltshire
People from Tidworth
English footballers
Association football forwards
Yeovil Town F.C. players
Dorchester Town F.C. players
Salisbury F.C. players
English Football League players
Southern Football League players